Wise County Christian School is a school in Wise, Virginia.
Its mascot is the eagle.

External links
School website

Private high schools in Virginia
Schools in Wise County, Virginia
Wise, Virginia